Alejandro Aragao Da Cruz (born 28 January 1986 in Gandu, Brazil), known as just Aragao, is a Brazilian footballer. He plays as a forward. He is currently unattached.

External links 
 Alejandro Aragao Da Cruz's profile on San Marino Calcio's official website

1986 births
Brazilian footballers
Living people
A.S.D. Victor San Marino players
A.C. Bellaria Igea Marina players
Brazilian expatriates in Italy
Association football forwards